Offizierstellvertreter Willi Kampe (15 March 1888 – 8 March 1918) was a World War I 
german flying ace credited with eight aerial victories.

Biography
Willi Kampe was born on 15 March 1888 in Hofgeismar, the German Empire. He performed his mandatory military service in the Imperial German Army between 1908 and 1910, serving with the 4th Guards Grenadier Regiment. 

When World War I broke out in 1914, Kampe was recalled to service; he joined the 5th Guards Regiment. He transferred to Die Fliegertruppe (the flying troops) in 1915. He first flew with Flieger-Abteilung (Flier Detachment) 35, before transferring to a fighter squadron, Jagdstaffel 8 for a short spell. On 15 February 1917, he took a posting with Jagdstaffel 27.

Beginning 12 August 1917, Kampe would shoot down eight opposing airplanes—seven fighters and an Airco DH.4 light bomber. His final victory came 8 March 1918 near Ypres, when he shot down a No. 19 Squadron Sopwith Dolphin at 1208 hours. He was killed in action in the process, probably by another 19 Squadron Dolphin flown by RAF 'ace' Capt. Patrick Huskinson. Willi Kampe had been honored with both classes of the Iron Cross by the time of his death.

Sources of information

References
 Franks, Norman; Bailey, Frank W.; Guest, Russell. Above the Lines: The Aces and Fighter Units of the German Air Service, Naval Air Service and Flanders Marine Corps, 1914–1918. Grub Street, 1993. , .

1918 deaths
1888 births
People from Hofgeismar
People from Hesse-Nassau
Prussian Army personnel
German military personnel killed in World War I
Luftstreitkräfte personnel
German World War I flying aces
Aviators killed by being shot down
Military personnel from Hesse